Christopher Lee Conrad (born May 27, 1975) is a former American football player in the National Football League (NFL). He played as an offensive tackle during his career for the Pittsburgh Steelers. He is currently the Offensive Line coach at Slippery Rock University

1975 births
Living people
California State University, Fresno alumni
Fresno State Bulldogs football players
Sportspeople from Fullerton, California
American football offensive tackles
Pittsburgh Steelers players